Shaun Benjamin MacDonald (born 17 June 1988) is a Welsh footballer who plays as a midfielder for Cymru Premier club Penybont.

A product of the Swansea City youth team, he earned four caps for Wales and is the current record caps holder for the Wales Under 21 team with 25 caps. As well as Swansea, MacDonald played club football for Yeovil Town (on loan), AFC Bournemouth, Wigan Athletic, Rotherham United and Crewe Alexandra.

Club career

Swansea City
MacDonald was born in Swansea, and began his career with his home side Swansea City, making his way up through the youth ranks before being making his first-team debut on 31 August 2005 in a 3–1 defeat to Reading in the League Cup. He went on to make a total of 13 appearances in all competitions during his first season, including playing four times in the Football League Trophy as Swansea went on to win the trophy.

He scored his first goals for the club during the 2008–09 season against Brentford in the League Cup on 12 August 2008, but after making just six appearances during the season, he was allowed to join League One side Yeovil Town on a one-month loan deal on 27 January 2009. On his debut for the side, MacDonald scored the only goal of the game in a 1–0 win over Huddersfield Town, going on to make a total of four appearances before returning to Swansea.

After making just three appearances during the start of the 2009–10 season, MacDonald returned to Yeovil Town on a three-month loan deal on 21 September. MacDonald impressed for Yeovil in his three-month loan spell starting all 12 of Yeovil's league games and grabbing 2 goals.

Once he returned to Swansea, negotiation began with Yeovil regarding a loan deal back at Yeovil until the end of the 2009–10 season. The loan deal was agreed on 31 December 2009.

In late August 2010, MacDonald returned to Yeovil on loan for the fourth time in less than two years until January 2011.

He joined Yeovil on loan for the fifth time on 17 March 2011, until the end of the 2010–11 season. He scored a first half hat-trick on 26 March 2011 in a 5–1 win over Leyton Orient.

AFC Bournemouth
MacDonald signed for AFC Bournemouth on 25 August 2011, for a fee believed to be in the region of £125,000. He scored his first goal for Bournemouth in a 4–1 Football League Trophy win over Hereford United on 30 August 2011. His first league goal for the club came on 21 April 2012 against Colchester United. He made five league appearances during Bournemouth's 2014–15 season after which they were promoted to the Premier League. MacDonald made his Premier League debut as a substitute against Manchester City on 17 October 2015.

Wigan Athletic
MacDonald returned to the Championship and signed for newly promoted Wigan Athletic on 13 August 2016. MacDonald scored his first goal for the club in a 1–1 draw against Leeds United on 18 October 2016. He missed all of the 2017-18 campaign after suffering a broken leg in a defeat at Reading in April 2017.

Rotherham United
On 3 June 2019, following his release from Wigan Athletic, MacDonald signed for League One side Rotherham United on a two-year deal. His time at the club was impacted by illness and injury, with a virus keeping him out of the side for a significant spell during the 2019–20 season, and a broken leg side-lining him for over two months in the middle of the 2020–21 season. On 17 May 2021, Rotherham United published their retained list, and confirmed MacDonald would be leaving the club at the end of his contract.

Crewe Alexandra
On 24 June 2021, it was announced that Macdonald had agreed to join Crewe Alexandra on a two-year deal. He made his Crewe debut on 7 August 2021, coming on as a second-half substitute in a 1–1 league draw against Cheltenham Town at Gresty Road. However, on 1 September 2021, Crewe confirmed that MacDonald had left the club after making just four appearances, having decided to retire from professional football.

Penybont
On 23 December 2021, MacDonald 
came out of retirement to sign for Cymru Premier side Penybont on an 18-month deal.

International career
MacDonald has represented his country at under-19 and Under-21 levels. In June 2009 he was called into the full national squad for the World Cup qualifier in Azerbaijan in Baku. After playing his 22nd game at under-21 level he surpassed the Welsh appearance record previously set by James Thomas.

MacDonald made his full international debut on 12 October 2010 against Switzerland in Basel and earned his second cap against Israel in a 2016 European Championships qualifying match in 2015.

Career statistics

Club

International

Honours
Swansea City
 Football League Trophy: 2005–06

AFC Bournemouth
 Football League Championship: 2014–15
 Football League One Runners-up: 2011–12

References

External links

1988 births
Living people
Footballers from Swansea
Welsh people of Scottish descent
Welsh footballers
Wales youth international footballers
Wales under-21 international footballers
Wales international footballers
English Football League players
Premier League players
Swansea City A.F.C. players
Yeovil Town F.C. players
AFC Bournemouth players
Wigan Athletic F.C. players
Rotherham United F.C. players
Crewe Alexandra F.C. players
Association football midfielders
Penybont F.C. players
Cymru Premier players